Bad Thief, Good Thief is a 2017 South Korean television series starring Ji Hyun-woo, Seohyun, Kim Ji-hoon, Lim Ju-eun and others. It replaced Father, I'll Take Care For You and aired on MBC on Saturdays and Sundays at 22:00 (KST) from May 13 to November 5, 2017 for 50 episodes.

Plot
The story of the descendants of the Korean activists during the Japanese colonial rule who became the important figures of the history. They were unaware of their identity as it will harm their lives.

Cast

Main cast
Ji Hyun-woo as Jang Dol-mok / Kim Soo-hyun
Kim Kang-hoon as young Jang Dol-mok
Baek-san's descendant. His identity is hidden by his foster father as he is the key to find the treasure map.
Seohyun as Kang So-joo
Moon So-hee as young Kang So-joo
A police-woman-turned-investigator who struggles to fight against the abusive officials.
Kim Ji-hoon as Han Joon-hee / Jang Min-jae
Nam Da-reum as young Jang Min-jae
Moon Woo-jin as child Jang Min-jae
Dol-mok's missing brother. He holds grudges because of his bitter past and vows to change his ill-fated life.
Lim Ju-eun as Yoon Hwa-young
 as young Yoon Hwa-young
So-joo's friend turns enemy. A wolf in sheep's clothing. She likes to get everyone's attention. She appears to like Joon-hee but only actually frustrated because he shows no signs of liking her.

Supporting

People around Jang Dol-mok
Ahn Gil-kang as Jang Pan-soo
Jung Kyung-soon as Park Ha-kyung
Shin Eun-jung as Min Hae-won

People around Kang So-joo
Kim Jung-tae as Kang Sung-il, So Joo's father

Yoon Joong-tae's family and Hong family
Choi Jong-hwan as Yoon Joong-tae
Choi Su-rin as Hong Shin-ae
Jang Gwang as Hong Il-kwon
Seo Yi-sook as Hong Mi-ae
 as Lee Chang-young
… as Yang Ki-young
 as Lee Yoon-ho
Jeon Jin-seo as young Lee Yoon-ho
Han Jung-soo as Choi Tae-suk

Extended

Lee Joo-sil as Kim Soon-chun
Lee Jung-eun as Kwon Jung-hee
Woo Hee-jin as Park Sun-jin
Lee Se-chang as Lee Eun-suk
Lee Sang-woo as Oh Song-sik
Yoon Ji-won as Go Eun-ji
Ryu Ji-an as Park Yeo-wool
Shorry J as Heo Jong-bum
Kim Joon-won as Choi Kang-gyu
Lee Bong-won as Nam Jong-hab
Jo Duk-hyun as Kim Chan-gi
Kang Ji-won as Secretary Heo 
Ko Byung-wan as Song Gook-hyun

Special appearances
 Kim Dae-sung
 Kim Young-hee
 Yoon Yong-hyun as Lee Chul-ho

Ratings
In the table below,  represent the lowest ratings and  represent the highest ratings.

Awards and nominations

Notes

References

External links 
  
 
 

Korean-language television shows
2017 South Korean television series debuts
2017 South Korean television series endings
MBC TV television dramas
South Korean crime television series